Buledi is a clan of the Buledi (Burdi) tribe, a Baloch people, in Balochistan and Sindh, Pakistan. Bijarani is a clan of the Marri people.

Notes

See also
 Buleda

Social groups of Pakistan
Sindhi tribes
Baloch tribes
Pakistani names
Balochi-language surnames